Kouakou Komenan (born 1942) is an Ivorian sprinter. He competed in the men's 100 metres at the 1972 Summer Olympics.

References

1942 births
Living people
Athletes (track and field) at the 1972 Summer Olympics
Ivorian male sprinters
Olympic athletes of Ivory Coast
Place of birth missing (living people)